Congliptious is a 1968 album by Roscoe Mitchell's Art Ensemble which later became the Art Ensemble of Chicago. It was released on the Nessa label and features performances by Mitchell, Lester Bowie, Malachi Favors, and Robert Crowder. "Tutankhamen" is a bass solo by Malahi Favors, "Tkhke" is an alto saxophone solo by Roscoe Mitchell and "Jazz Death?" is a trumpet solo by Lester Bowie with the full ensemble performing "Congliptious/Old".

Track listing
Side One
 "Tutankhamen" (Favors) – 6:38
 "Tkhke" - 6:58
 "Jazz Death?" (Bowie) - 7:19
Side Two
 "Congliptious/Old" - 19:28
All compositions by Roscoe Mitchell except as indicated
Side One recorded 4 March 1968, Side Two recorded 11 March 1968.

Personnel
Roscoe Mitchell – alto saxophone, soprano saxophone, bass saxophone, flute, recorder, percussion (on "Tkhke" & "Congliptious/Old")
Lester Bowie – trumpet, flugelhorn, steer horn, bass drum, percussion (on "Jazz Death?" & "Congliptious/Old")
Malachi Favors – bass, electric bass, percussion (on "Tutankhamen" & "Congliptious/Old")
Robert Crowder – drums (on "Congliptious/Old")

References

1968 albums
Nessa Records albums
Roscoe Mitchell albums
Art Ensemble of Chicago albums